The 2012–13 Northern Colorado Bears men's basketball team represented the University of Northern Colorado during the 2012–13 NCAA Division I men's basketball season. The Bears, led by third year head coach B. J. Hill, played their home games at the Butler–Hancock Sports Pavilion and were of the Big Sky Conference. They finished the season 13–18, 10–10 in Big Sky play to finish in a tie for fourth place. They advanced to the semifinals of the Big Sky tournament where they lost to Montana.

Roster

Schedule

|-
!colspan=9| Exhibition

|-
!colspan=9| Regular season

|-
!colspan=9| 2013 Big Sky Conference men's basketball tournament

References

Northern Colorado Bears men's basketball seasons
Northern Colorado
Northern Colorado Bears men's basketball
Northern Colorado Bears men's basketball